Algerian baklawa, also known as "baklawa algéroise" or "Kaak Warqa", is a sweet pastry that is popular in Algeria. It is a variation of the traditional baklava that is commonly found in Middle Eastern cuisine.

Algerian baklawa is a beloved dessert that has a rich history and cultural significance in Algeria. Its origins can be traced back to the Ottoman Empire, which introduced baklava to Algeria and other regions of North Africa during its period of rule. However, over time, Algerian baklawa has developed its own distinct style and flavor that sets it apart from traditional baklava.

One of the key differences between Algerian baklawa and traditional baklava is the use of almonds instead of walnuts as the main filling ingredient. This gives Algerian baklawa a unique flavor and texture that is slightly different from other varieties of baklava. The almonds are ground into a fine powder and mixed with sugar and orange blossom water to create a sweet and fragrant filling that is both rich and nutty.

Another difference between Algerian baklawa and other types of baklava is the way that it is prepared. Algerian baklawa is typically made with a special type of phyllo pastry known as "warqa," which is thinner and more delicate than the phyllo pastry used in traditional baklava. The warqa is carefully layered with the almond filling, and then the pastry is cut into diamond-shaped pieces before being baked until golden brown and crispy.

Once the Algerian baklawa has been baked, it is soaked in a syrup made from honey, sugar, and sometimes lemon juice. This syrup adds a sweet and tangy flavor to the dessert and also helps to keep the pastry moist and tender. The finished product is a delicious and indulgent treat that is perfect for special occasions and celebrations.

References 

Algerian cuisine
Algerian desserts
Ottoman cuisine